Ab Anjir (also Romanized as Āb Anjīr) is a village in Dalfard Rural District, Sarduiyeh District, Jiroft County, Kerman Province, Iran. At the 2006 census, its population was 53, in 13 families.

References 

Populated places in Jiroft County